The 2018 Sun Belt Conference men's soccer tournament was the 24th edition of the Sun Belt Conference Men's Soccer Tournament. The tournament will decide the Sun Belt Conference champion.  The tournament will be begin on November 7 and conclude on November 11.

Coastal Carolina were the defending champions.  However, they were unable to defend their title, losing to Georgia State 1–2 in the Semifinals.  Georgia State went on to win the tournament 4–2 over Georgia Southern in the final.  This was the first Sun Belt Conference Championship for Georgia State.

Seeds

Bracket

Results

First round

Semifinals

Final

Statistics

Goalscorers
3 Goals
 Hannes Burmeister - Georgia Southern

2 Goals
 Javier Carbonell - Georgia Southern
 Frank Rosenwald - Georgia State

1 Goal
 Aldair Cortes - Georgia Southern
 Adam Davie - Georgia Southern
 Jaiden Fortune - Coastal Carolina
 Daniel Hart - Howard
 Max Hemmings - Georgia State
 Tyrone Mondi - Coastal Carolina
 Tsiki Ntsabeleng - Coastal Carolina
 Sander Wang - Georgia Southern

All Tournament Team

References

External links 
 2018 Sun Belt Men's Soccer Championship Central

2018
Sun Belt Men's Soccer